Synthetic resins are industrially produced resins, typically viscous substances that convert into rigid polymers by the process of curing.  In order to undergo curing, resins typically contain reactive end groups, such as acrylates or epoxides. Some synthetic resins have properties similar to natural plant resins, but many do not.

Synthetic resins are of several classes. Some are manufactured by esterification of organic compounds. Some are thermosetting plastics in which the term "resin" is loosely applied to the reactant(s), the product, or both. "Resin" may be applied to one of two monomers in a copolymer, the other being called a "hardener", as in epoxy resins. For thermosetting plastics that require only one monomer, the monomer compound is the "resin". For example, liquid methyl methacrylate is often called the "resin" or "casting resin" while in the liquid state, before it polymerizes and "sets". After setting, the resulting poly(methyl methacrylate) (PMMA) is often renamed "acrylic glass" or "acrylic". (This is the same material called Plexiglas and Lucite).

Types

The classic variety is epoxy resin, manufactured through polymerization-polyaddition or polycondensation reactions, used as a thermoset polymer for adhesives and composites. Epoxy resin is two times stronger than concrete, seamless, and waterproof.  Accordingly, it has been mainly in use for industrial flooring purposes since the 1960s. Since 2000, however, epoxy and polyurethane resins are used in interiors as well, mainly in Western Europe.

Synthetic casting "resin" for embedding display objects in Plexiglas/Lucite (PMMA) is simply methyl methacrylate liquid, into which a polymerization catalyst is added and mixed, causing it to "set" (polymerize). The polymerization creates a block of PMMA plastic ("acrylic glass") which holds the display object inside a transparent block.

Another synthetic polymer, sometimes called by the same general category, is acetal resin. By contrast with the other synthetics, however, it has a simple chain structure with the repeat unit of form −[CH2O]−.

Ion-exchange resins are used in water purification and catalysis of organic reactions. (See also AT-10 resin, melamine resin.) Certain ion-exchange resins are also used pharmaceutically as bile acid sequestrants, mainly as hypolipidemic agents, although they may be used for purposes other than lowering cholesterol.

Solvent impregnated resins (SIRs) are porous resin particles which contain an additional liquid extractant inside the porous matrix. The contained extractant is supposed to enhance the capacity of the resin particles.

A large category of resins, which constitutes 75% of resins used, is that of the unsaturated polyester resins.

The production of PVC entails the production of "vinyl chloride resins", which differ in the degree of polymerization.

Silicone resins 
Silicone resins are silicone-based polymers that exhibit various useful properties like weatherability (durability), dielectricity, water repellency, thermal stability, and chemical inertness.

Health hazards
Health hazards potentially associated with synthetic resins are typically less of a concern than the hazards associated with the cured products, which are more commonly in contact with consumers.  Issues of interest include the effects of unconsumed monomers, oligomers, and solvent carriers.

Dental restorative materials based on bis-GMA-containing resins can break down into or be contaminated with the related compound bisphenol A, a potential endocrine disruptor. However, no negative health effects of bis-GMA use in dental resins have been found.

See also
 Prepolymer
 Resin casting
 Waterborne resins

References

 
Plastics
Polymers